Oak Grove High School is a 6A high school located outside of Hattiesburg, Mississippi, United States, in Oak Grove. The principal is Helen Price. It is part of the Lamar County School District and serves students from grades 9-12.

Awards and recognition
Oak Grove is a three-time National Blue Ribbon School, having been designated as such in 1986–1987, 1992–1993, and 2004.

Oak Grove High School is the 2019 recipient of the National Performing Arts School Excellence Award.

Extracurricular activities

In 2008, the school's drama department represented Mississippi at SETC (South Eastern Theatre Conference) for the fifth time. The department won awards in the categories of "Best Technical", "Best Ensemble", and "Most Congenial." Oak Grove High School was only the third school in Mississippi to win the competition since SETC's conception in 1949.

The OGHS Golden Spirits dance team have won 15 state titles (jazz, kick, and pom divisions), and are the reigning state champion in jazz for the fifth consecutive year.

The OGHS Varsity Cheerleaders have won 14 state titles and have been UCA National finalists.

Athletics

Football
Oak Grove High School's football team gained prominence while former National Football League quarterback Brett Favre was the offensive coordinator for the team in 2012 and 2013. Oak Grove defeated the Sumrall Bobcats 64-6 in Favre's first game as a coach.

On December 6, 2013, the Oak Grove Warriors played their first 6A State Championship game since 2009 against the Tupelo Golden Wave, and won their first state championship.

On December 4, 2020, the Oak Grove Warriors won against the Oxford Chargers in the 6A State Championship game. The final score was 29 - 28.

Recent events
Oak Grove's football and baseball facilities were destroyed on Sunday, February 10, 2013 by the 2013 Hattiesburg, Mississippi tornado, which caused EF-4 damage near the school. The school building itself sustained little damage from the tornado.

References

Public high schools in Mississippi
Schools in Lamar County, Mississippi